The 2011 Asset Protect East–West Shrine Game was the 86th staging of the all-star college football exhibition game featuring NCAA Division I Football Bowl Subdivision players. The game featured over 100 players from the 2010 college football season, and prospects for the 2011 Draft of the professional National Football League (NFL). In the week prior to the game, scouts from all 32 NFL teams attended.  The proceeds from the East-West Shrine Game benefit Shriners Hospitals for Children.

This oldest all-star game was played on January 22, 2011, at 4 p.m. ET at the Florida Citrus Bowl. The Pat Tillman Award was presented to Josh McNary (LB, Army), who "best exemplifies character, intelligence, sportsmanship and service".

Game notes

Scoring summary

Statistics

Source:

2011 NFL Draft

References

Further reading
 

East-West Shrine Game
East–West Shrine Bowl
American football in Orlando, Florida
January 2011 sports events in the United States
East-West Shrine Game
2010s in Orlando, Florida